The Brisbane Lions' 2016 season was its 20th season in the Australian Football League (AFL). The club won only 3 matches during the season, finishing second from bottom.

Squad

Season summary

Pre-season matches

Premiership Season

Home and away season

Ladder

References

Brisbane Lions Season, 2016
Brisbane Lions seasons